Cristian Alejandro Febre Santis (born December 10, 1983) is a Chilean football manager and former footballer who played for clubs in Chile, Indonesia and Ecuador.

Managerial career
He began his career as the manager of the Santiago Morning youth system, winning the 2019 National Championship at under-17 level. In 2022, he became the manager of Santiago City FC, a new club based in Las Condes, Santiago, in the Tercera B, the fifth division of the Chilean football.

In 2023, he joined Deportes Colina in the Tercera A.

Honours

Manager
Santiago Morning U17
 Campeonato Nacional Fútbol Joven (1): 2019

References

External links
 
 Cristian Febre at playmakerstats.com (English version of ceroacero.es)

1983 births
Living people
Association football defenders
People from Santiago Province, Chile
Chilean footballers
Chilean expatriate footballers
Audax Italiano footballers
Deportes La Serena footballers
Universidad de Concepción footballers
Santiago Morning footballers
Coquimbo Unido footballers
Unión Temuco footballers
Persiraja Banda Aceh players
PSM Makassar players
C.D. Técnico Universitario footballers
Bali United F.C. players
Primera B de Chile players
Chilean Primera División players
Indonesian Premier League players
Ecuadorian Serie A players
Expatriate footballers in Indonesia
Expatriate footballers in Ecuador
Chilean expatriate sportspeople in Indonesia
Chilean expatriate sportspeople in Ecuador
Footballers from Santiago
Chilean football managers